Erwin Lanc (born May 17, 1930) is a former Austrian bank employee and politician (SPÖ, Austrian Social Democratic Party).

Biography 
Born in Vienna, Lanc worked at the Ministry of Social Affairs from 1949 to 1955. In 1959, he joined the Vienna-based Zentralsparkasse. In 1966, he became chairman of the SPÖ in the Margareten district of Vienna. He was a member of the Vienna city council and provincial parliament from 1960 to 1966.  From 1966 to 1983 he was a member of the Nationalrat. In 1973, he joined the government as the Minister of Transport. In 1977 he became Minister of the Interior, and from 1983 to 1984 he served as Minister of Foreign Affairs.

References 

1930 births
Living people
20th-century Austrian people
Foreign ministers of Austria
Members of the National Council (Austria)
Austrian people of Slavic descent
Politicians from Vienna
People from Margareten